All books in the various Tom Swift book series. All books are credited to the pseudonym Victor Appleton (or, in the case of the Tom Swift Jr. series, Victor Appleton II), while the character was created by Edward Stratemeyer for his book packaging house, the Stratemeyer Syndicate. Counterparts to the Tom Swift character and series are later Stratemeyer creations, The Hardy Boys and Nancy Drew, the former of which Swift crossed over with in the fourth series.

The original Tom Swift series
The first novels to feature the Tom Swift character were released in 1910 by Grosset & Dunlap. The series was created by Edward Stratemeyer, and written by several ghostwriters in its duration.

The first 38 titles were published by Grosset & Dunlap, with two ghostwriters: Howard Garis wrote the first thirty-five titles, while Harriet Adams wrote the final three. Two more titles were published as a part of the Big Little Book series (by rival Western Publishing), and were ghostwritten by Thomas Moyston Mitchell.

Tom Swift Jr.
Officially titled Tom Swift Jr., the second series was published by Grosset & Dunlap from 1954 to 1971. Tom Swift and the Visitor from Planet X and Tom Swift and the Electronic Hydrolung are in the public domain, and are available as downloadable texts from Project Gutenberg.

Tom Swift (1981)

The third Tom Swift series was launched following the Stratemeyer Syndicate moving publishers to Simon & Schuster. The series was published under the publisher's Wanderer imprint (as were the Nancy Drew and Hardy Boys books at the time), and lasted from 1981 to 1984. This series took place in outer space and featured fan-favorite character Aristotle the Robot, who was introduced in the second volume.

The series was cancelled in 1984, when Simon & Schuster bought the Syndicate. Two titles — Chaos on Earth and The Micro World — were written by Neal Barrett, but not published before its cancellation. The manuscripts of the two titles are in the Syndicate's archives, which are held at the New York Public Library.

Tom Swift (1991)

The fourth Tom Swift series was created as a counterpart to The Nancy Drew Files and The Hardy Boys Casefiles spin-offs, and was published by Archway from 1991 to 1993. The series had two books which crossed over with the Hardy Boys, a sub-series titled Hardy Boys and Tom Swift Ultra Thrillers — Time Bomb (August 1992) and The Alien Factor (June 1993).

Tom Swift: Young Inventor
The fifth series to feature the Tom Swift character was published by Aladdin from 2006 to 2007. The series served as a counterpart to Nancy Drew: Girl Detective and The Hardy Boys: Undercover Brothers series, both of which were reboots of their original series. Like its counterparts, a big part of the reboot was that titles were now written in first-person narration.

The series was cancelled in late 2007, while its counterparts were rebooted into trilogies. A seventh title, Extraterrestrial Highway, was planned for publication in February 2008; however, it ultimately remained unpublished. There are ISBN's registered for volumes 8-11 in this series, but the titles and status of the manuscripts are unknown.

Tom Swift Inventors' Academy
The sixth series to feature the Tom Swift character was launched by Aladdin in July 2019. It features a young Swift, age is around thirteen, who attends a school for young inventors and scientists. This series, a counterpart to the Hardy Boys Adventures and Nancy Drew Diaries series, is told in first-person narration, and published in eBook, paperback, and hardcover. Audiobooks of the first five titles released on CD narrated by Timothy Andres Pabon. A boxed set of the first four paperbacks was also published using cover art from the first book.

References

Notes

Book series introduced in 1910
Tom Swift